Zhengde (24 January 1506 – 27 January 1522) was the era name of the Zhengde Emperor, the 11th emperor of the Ming dynasty of China. The Ming dynasty used the era name Zhengde for a total of 16 years.

On 27 May 1521 (Zhengde 16, 22nd day of the 4th month), the Jiajing Emperor ascended to the throne and continued to use. The era was changed to Jiajing in the following year.

Comparison table

Other regime era names that existed during the same period
 China
 Mingzheng (明正, 1511): Ming period — era name of Cao Fu (曹甫)
 Dashunpingding (大順平定, 1520): Ming period — era name of Duan Chang (段長)
 Shunde (順德, 1519): Ming period — era name of Zhu Chenhao
 Vietnam
 Đoan Khánh (端慶, 1504–1509): Later Lê dynasty — era name of Lê Uy Mục
 Hồng Thuận (洪順, 1509–1516): Later Lê dynasty — era name of Lê Tương Dực
 Quang Thiệu (光紹, 1516–1522): Later Lê dynasty — era name of Lê Chiêu Tông
 Đại Đức (大德 , 1518): Later Lê dynasty — era name of Lê Bảng (黎榜)
 Thiên Hiến (天憲, 1519): Later Lê dynasty — era name of Lê Do (黎槱)
 Thống Nguyên (統元, 1522–1526): Later Lê dynasty — era name of Lê Cung Hoàng
 Tuyên Hòa (宣和, 1516–1521): Later Lê dynasty — era name of Trần Xương (陳昌)
 Japan
 Eishō (永正, 1504–1521): era name of Emperor Go-Kashiwabara
 Daiei (大永, 1521–1528): era name of Emperor Go-Kashiwabara and Emperor Go-Nara

See also
 List of Chinese era names
 List of Ming dynasty era names

References

Further reading

Ming dynasty eras